Microlepidotus is a genus of grunts native to the Pacific coast of North America.
The currently recognized species in this genus are:
 Microlepidotus brevipinnis (Steindachner, 1869) (humpback grunt)
 Microlepidotus inornatus T. N. Gill, 1862 (wavyline grunt)

References

Haemulinae
Marine fish genera
Ray-finned fish genera
Fish of the Pacific Ocean
Taxa named by Theodore Gill